The Junkers CL.I was a ground-attack aircraft developed in Germany during World War I. Its construction was undertaken by Junkers under the designation J 8 as proof of Hugo Junkers' belief in the monoplane, after his firm had been required by the Idflieg to submit a biplane (the J 4) as its entry in a competition to select a ground-attack aircraft. The J 8 design took the J 7 fighter as its starting point, but had a longer fuselage to accommodate a tail gunner, and larger wings. The prototype flew in late 1917 and was followed over the next few months by three more development aircraft. The Idflieg was sufficiently impressed to want to order the type, but had misgivings about Junkers' ability to manufacture the aircraft in quantity and considered asking Linke-Hoffmann to produce the type under licence. Finally, however, Junkers was allowed to undertake the manufacture as part of a joint venture with Fokker, producing a slightly modified version of the J 8 design as the J 10. Like the other Junkers designs of the period, the aircraft featured a metal framework that was skinned with corrugated duralumin sheets. 47 examples were delivered before the Armistice, including three built as floatplanes under the designation CLS.I (factory designation J 11). After the war, one or two CL.Is were converted for commercial service by enclosing the rear cockpit under a canopy.

Operators

Luftstreitkrafte
Kaiserliche Marine

Latvian Air Force - Postwar.

Specifications (CL.I)

References

Notes

Bibliography
 
  

 
 

1910s German attack aircraft
CL.I
Aircraft first flown in 1917